Squire Fridell (born February 9, 1943) is an American retired actor, author, and winemaker who appeared in over three thousand television commercials; he also appeared as Ronald McDonald in McDonald's commercials from 1985 to 1991.

Early life 
Fridell was born in Oakland, California. He attended the University of the Pacific where he was a member of Phi Sigma Kappa fraternity.

Career 
Fridell began his acting career on stage in South Carolina in 1968. In 1974 he was an acting teacher at El Rancho High School in Pico Rivera, California.

From 1978 to 2012, he was a spokesman in the American TV ads for the Toyota Motor Corporation. Fridell became the official Ronald McDonald clown character in 1985, after King Moody retired from the role. He portrayed the character in the McDonald's Corporation television commercials and for the chain fast-food restaurants for six years until 1991. Besides the commercials, he also portrayed the character in the 1988 film Mac and Me and provided the voice of the character in the 1989 DiC animated film The Adventures of Ronald McDonald: McTreasure Island. From the 1970s until the mid-1990s, Fridell also had supporting character roles in a number of popular TV series, such as  M*A*S*H, Newhart, Ironside and Adam-12.

In 1980, Harmony Books published Fridell's book, Acting in Television Commercials for Fun and Profit, subsequently re-released by Random House in 2005.

Fridell returned as himself in several Toyota commercials in 2010, responding to the image damage the company suffered due to a slow response to safety issues in 2009.

He is also the co-owner and operator of GlenLyon Vineyards.

Author 
Fridell, Squire.  Acting in Television Commercials for Fun and Profit, 4th Edition (2009).  Penguin Random House.

Personal life 

Squire and Suzy (a professional dancer and dance teacher for many years) were married in 1977. They have one daughter, Lexy, who is pursuing an acting career in New York City. The family currently resides in Glen Ellen (in the Sonoma Valley region of California) where they have operated the GlenLyon Vineyards and Winery since 1989.

His sister, Barbara, is married to former NFL player and coach Tom Flores.

Filmography

Film

Television

Video games

References

External links 

 GlenLyon Winery site
 

1943 births
American male film actors
American male television actors
Living people
Male actors from Oakland, California